Therubali Airstrip is a private airport located 3.3 km from Therubali city center in Rayagada district, Odisha.The Airstrip is spread over 30 acres and is under the control of the Indian Metals and Ferro Alloys Ltd (IMFA). The runway is 1,135 meters (around 3,724 ft) long and is periodically maintained by the IMFA.

See also
List of airports in India

References

Defunct airports in India
Airports in Odisha
Rayagada district
Airports with year of establishment missing